These are the official results of the Men's 400 metres Hurdles event at the 1987 IAAF World Championships in Rome, Italy. There were a total number of 47 participating athletes, with six qualifying heats, two semi-finals and the final held on Tuesday 1987-09-01.

Summary
After 122 consecutive victories, Edwin Moses's winning streak was finally broken in June by Danny Harris.  Harris was in lane 5, while Moses was in lane three.  Between them was Harald Schmid, the man who had last beaten Moses at the beginning of the streak.  Surrounding them were the usual suspects of 1980's long hurdling.

From the gun, Moses took the race out hard, making up the stagger to catch Schmid just past the fourth hurdle.  Harris was also out fast but not as aggressively as Moses, taking hurdles one stride behind.  Running his famous 13 steps, Moses pulled away through the final turn as Schmid accelerated to keep pace.  He had a two-metre lead coming of the 9th hurdle with Schmid passing Harris as Harris took the hurdle leaning back.  Moses maintained his lead over the final hurdle as Harris fought back to a slight advantage against Schmid.  But Moses was struggling to maintain his stride, Harris had the momentum and Schmid was responding to the challenge.  The gap was disappearing as all three were fighting to get to the line.  Moses dived for the line in desperation, Harris maintained form and Schmid gave a textbook lean reminiscent of Colin Jackson to try to get ahead.  In the closest 400 metres hurdles race in World Championship history, Moses saved the victory in 47.46, while Harris and Schmid were given the same time of 47.48, with Harris getting the nod for silver.

After 11 years of chasing Moses, it was a European record and personal best for Schmid.  Schmid's record would last almost 8 years and still ranks #16 on the all-time list.  It was a World Championship record for Moses.

Final

Semi-finals
Held on Monday 1983-08-31

Qualifying heats
Held on Sunday 1987-08-30

References
 Results

H
400 metres hurdles at the World Athletics Championships